Talal Sulaiman Al Rahbi (born May 3, 1974) is an Omani economist and politician. He is Deputy Secretary General for the Supreme Council for Planning.

References

1974 births
Living people
Omani politicians
Place of birth missing (living people)
21st-century economists